Bromma kyrka is a round church in the borough Bromma in Stockholm, Sweden. The oldest parts of the church were built in the later 12th century as a fortress church, and the church is among Stockholm's oldest buildings.

Today it has seven parts: roundhouse, nave, choir, sacristy, grave choir, weaponhouse and crypt.

History

Originally the church consisted of the round house and a choir on the east side. The nave and the sacristy were constructed in the mid 15th century, built in stone. In the 1480s Albertus Pictor or his pupils painted more than forty biblical church wall paintings, which were restored from overpaints by restorations in 1905–1906. Motives of the paintings are taken from both the Old and the New Testament. On the southern wall of the round house is a crucifix dated from the 15th century.

At the end of the 17th century several changes to the church were done by the vicar, Johannes Vultejus, vicar 1679–1700. The church's current roof, spire, pulpit and a wooden altar are from this period. The pulpit, dated from 1686, is a pentagon containing fields with paintings of Christ and the four evangelists. In 1703 a grave choir was constructed for the family Hjärne. The altarpiece is from 1818, surrounded by statues of Saint Peter and Paul, and the church also has some handsome epitaphs.

Relation to other churches
Other Swedish round churches are Solna kyrka, Munsö kyrka, Voxtorps kyrka, Hagby kyrka,  Valleberga kyrka, Skörstorps kyrka and Vårdsbergs kyrka.

In 1901, Bromma kyrka was one of two churches designated control points for the first public orienteering competition ever held in Sweden.

Bromma kyrka was selected Stockholms län's most beautiful church in a 2006 survey among listeners to a local radio station.

See also 
 List of churches in Stockholm

References

Churches in Stockholm
12th-century churches in Sweden
Churches in the Diocese of Stockholm (Church of Sweden)
Churches converted from the Roman Catholic Church to the Church of Sweden
Church frescos in Sweden
Fortified church buildings